Aleksandr Semyonovich Kapto (April 14, 1933 – April 19, 2020) was a Soviet and Russian sociologist, political scientist, diplomat, journalist and politician. He earned a philosophy degree in 1967 and his Ph.D. in 1985. In 2008 he was head of the UNESCO International Board of the Institute of Socio-Political Research under the Russian Academy of Sciences (RAS).

Education
Kapto graduated from Dnipropetrovsk University in 1957 with a philosophy degree, studying the problems of war and peace, international relations, political sociology, sociology of morality and education, social activity of youths, and professional ethics.

Career
In addition to his duties with UNESCO, Kapto served as Chairman of the Expert Council under the Top Certifying Commission for Political Science; Chairman of the Council for Defending a Doctoral Thesis under the Institute of Socio-Political Research (ISPR RAS) (sociology of spiritual life and management); Vice-President of the Academy of Social Sciences; and was a member of the Presidium of the Academy of Political Science. He was a Soviet Ambassador to Cuba from 1985-9, and the last Soviet and first Russian Ambassador to the Democratic People's Republic of Korea.

Writing career
Kapto was a member of the Union of Russian Writers. In 1971 and 1974 he received a first-degree diploma certificate for winning the All-Union Competition for the best popular science works.

Awards and prizes
Three Orders of the Red Banner of Labour
Order of Friendship of Peoples
Order of Honour (2003)
Cuban Order of Solidarity
S. Vavilov Medal for Outstanding Contribution to Spreading Scientific Knowledge, Enlightened and Humanitarian Activities
Honorary Citizen of Denver

Bibliography
Social activity as a moral trait of an individual. Kiev, 1968.
Public activity of youths. Moscow, 1971.
Class education: methodology, theory, practice. M., 1985.
Political memoirs. Moscow, 1996.
Nobel peacemakers. Moscow, 2002.
Encyclopedia of the world. Moscow, 2002 and 2005.
From the bellicose culture to the culture of peace. Moscow, 2002.

See also
Institute of Socio-Political Research

References and sources

A. Kapto’s biography (in Russian)

External links
Official Web site of the Russian Academy of Sciences
The official web site of the Institute of Socio-Political Research
The UNESCO International Board of the Institute of Socio-Political Research

1933 births
2020 deaths
People from Dnipropetrovsk Oblast
Ambassadors of Russia to North Korea
Ambassadors of the Soviet Union to Cuba
Ambassadors of the Soviet Union to North Korea
Central Committee of the Communist Party of the Soviet Union members
Head of Propaganda Department of CPSU CC
Oles Honchar Dnipro National University alumni
Politburo of the Central Committee of the Communist Party of Ukraine (Soviet Union) members
Recipients of the Order of Friendship of Peoples
Recipients of the Order of Honour (Russia)
Recipients of the Order of the Red Banner of Labour
Russian philosophers
Russian political scientists
Russian sociologists
Soviet philosophers
Soviet sociologists
Burials in Troyekurovskoye Cemetery